In 1976, Caravan played concerts to support the release of their latest album Blind Dog at St. Dunstans (1976). A recording of the show at the New Victoria Theatre in London on 4 May 1976 was released as Surprise Supplies featuring songs from Blind Dog at St. Dunstans plus "Love in Your Eye" from the 1972 album Waterloo Lily.

Recordings from a show recorded on 5 May (broadcast 17 May) for John Peel's BBC radio show appear on the 1998 album Ether Way: BBC Sessions 1975-77.

Track listing
"Here Am I" (Pye Hastings) – 6:15
"Chiefs and Indians" (Mike Wedgwood) – 5:22
"Can You Hear Me?" (Hastings) – 6:26
"All the Way" (Hastings) – 7:17
"A Very Smelly, Grubby Little Oik / Bobbing Wide / Come on Back / Oik (reprise)" (Hastings) – 13:01
"Love in Your Eye" – 16:57 (Richard Coughlan, Hastings, Richard Sinclair)

Personnel
Caravan
 Pye Hastings – vocals, guitar
 Geoffrey Richardson – viola
 Jan Schelhaas – keyboards
 Mike Wedgwood – vocals, bass guitar
 Richard Coughlan – drums

Additional personnel
 Jimmy Hastings – clarinet, flute, saxophone

Releases information 
 1999: CD HTD 96
 2000:	CD Import 70096
 2002:	CD Talking Elephant 039

References

External links
 
 
 Caravan - Surprise Supplies album releases & credits at Discogs.com

Caravan (band) live albums
1999 live albums